The Kahiltna Peaks are two prominent summits on a western spur of Denali in the central Alaska Range, in Denali National Park.

See also
Mountain peaks of Alaska

References

Alaska Range
Mountains of Denali Borough, Alaska
Mountains of Alaska
Denali National Park and Preserve